Lachenalia orchioides, the orchidlike Cape cowslip, is a species of flowering plant in the genus Lachenalia, native to the Cape Provinces of South Africa. It has gained the Royal Horticultural Society's Award of Garden Merit.

Subspecies
The following subspecies are currently accepted:
Lachenalia orchioides subsp. glaucina (Jacq.) G.D.Duncan
Lachenalia orchioides subsp. orchioides 
Lachenalia orchioides subsp. parviflora (W.F.Barker) G.D.Duncan

References

orchioides
Endemic flora of South Africa
Plants described in 1789